The Destructors are an English punk rock band from Peterborough, England, originally existing between 1977 and 1979 and then 1980 until 1984. They reformed as Destructors 666 in 2006 and then changed to The Destructors in 2009. The Destructors continue releasing their own brand of punk / skuzz / garage to this day.

History
The band was formed by former 6ck 6ck 6ck members Allen Adams (vocals), Phil Atterson (guitar), and Dip (Paul Wicks) (bass) and various drummers including Steve Rolls and Dave Colton. Later the original band were complemented with a varying line-up including Andy Butler (drums) Andrew Jackson (guitar). Butler and Jackson left in 1978 to set up a new band called The Blanks. Some of Jackson's songs were used in later Destructors recordings. A Blanks 3 track EP featured the song Northern Ripper which Allen Adams wrote the words. In 1980 The Destructors name was resurrected by Adams with a new line-up of Neil Singleton (vocals), Andy McDonald (drums), and 'Dave Ivermee ' (rhythm guitar) Allen Adams(bass) and later Graham "Gizz" Butt (lead guitar, formerly of The System, among other bands) before their first release, 1982's Senseless Violence EP. Butt took on the job of writing about half of the band's music, with Adams writing the lyrics. Singleton remembered the songs: "They could be very complicated and a right bastard to remember. He also seemed to have a fixation with serial killers!". A series of EPs and two albums followed before 1984's final album Bomb Hanoi, Bomb Saigon, Bomb Disneyland. The band split shortly after Bomb Hanoi, their records never living up to their live shows, and the band members falling out. According to Singleton: "I don't think we ever made a really good record! They never ever lived up to our live shows; We were so much better on stage". Of the frictions within the band, Butt said: "Neil couldn't get on with Alan, and me and Dave didn't want Andy on drums any more. We weren't happy with Alan organising everything and neglecting his bass-playing role". Adams immediately formed a new band, Five Go Mad In Europe, and resurrected the band name as Destructors V in 1984. Singleton went on to front Trench Fever. Butt went on to form The Desecrators, joined English Dogs, and later formed Janus Stark and then The More I See, also playing guitar with The Prodigy.

The band name was resurrected again in 2006 as Destructors 666, with former members Adams, Dave Colton, and Steve Rolls ex of The Now joined by new members Steve Crosby and Lee Reynolds. Steve Crosby walked out of the studio one night and was never heard from again. Lee Reynolds left the band due to recording commitments with The 925's. Crosby and Reynolds were replaced by Ian Stapleton (bass) and Rob Baylis (drums). In 2009, the band returned to the original name of The Destructors.

Allen 'The Kid' Adams died on 12 November 2019.

Discography

Destructors releases 1982–1984

Destructors V release 1984 - Releases from the short-lived Destructors variable Destructors V

Destructors 666 releases 2006–2009
Destructors 666 started as a one off project with the release of Plus Ca Change Pour La Meme Chose. However, all copies were sold due to the solid fanbase of the band and their strong legacy to the world of punk rock. The split EP is seen as something unique to The Destructors and provides an opportunity to showcase other local talent. All contributors retain full rights to their material and receive costs for recording as well as free copies of the finished CD's. Date EP's started as an idea around the 666 label (Released on the 6th day of the 6th month of the 6th year of the 21st century and continued every year, i.e. 777, 888 etc. Often these are split releases though not always. Concept EPs are another format and cover areas such as Police / CCTV / Witchcraft (Racial Intolerance) etc. Finally, full blown Destructors only releases.

The Destructors releases 2009 – 2019
The present day lineup of The Destructors. Continuing to release multi theme albums / EP's and split EP's

Band members timeline
This is an overview of the history of The Destructors. Now over 34 years old and still recording and releasing new material.
Timeline

References

External links
Official website
The Destructors at UK82

English punk rock groups
Musical groups established in 1977
Musical groups from Cambridgeshire